Ibor Bakar (born 26 October 1986) is a Comorian football midfielder, who plays for French fourth division side US Marignane. He also holds French citizenship.

International career
He has competed with the Comoros national football team, including scoring a goal in a 6–2 loss to Madagascar in October 2007. The match was the first leg of a preliminary round knockout tie, the winner progressing to the CAF group stages for 2010 World Cup qualification.

Personal life
His brother Djamel plays for Ligue 1 club Montpellier.

External links

1986 births
Living people
French sportspeople of Comorian descent
Citizens of Comoros through descent
Footballers from Marseille
Association football midfielders
French footballers
Comorian footballers
Comoros international footballers
Athlético Marseille players
Marignane Gignac Côte Bleue FC players
AS Gardanne players
Comorian expatriate footballers
Expatriate footballers in France